Asteronotus cespitosus is a species of sea slug or dorid nudibranch, a marine gastropod mollusk in the family Discodorididae.

Distribution 
This is a widespread Indo-West Pacific marine species which occurs in the Red Sea and from the Indian Ocean coasts of Tanzania, Madagascar, Seychelles and Mauritius to Indonesia, the Philippines, New Guinea, Australia and out into the Pacific Ocean as far as Hawaii and Japan.

Description
The body of this nudibranch grows to a length of 250 mm. It is distinctive, with ridges of large tubercles running down centre of body, and a series of tubercles running parallel to the margin. The body is firm leathery. Its colour varies from blackish grey to brown, with paler tubercles and patches of white. This provides the species with camouflage well suited to its preferred habitat. The egg ribbon, in contrast, is pink.

Ecology
Asteronotus cespitosus feeds on sponges.

References

External links
 

Discodorididae
Gastropods described in 1824